John Bigelow Sr. (November 25, 1817 – December 19, 1911) was an American lawyer, statesman, and historian who edited the complete works of Benjamin Franklin and the first autobiography of Franklin taken from Franklin's previously lost original manuscript. He played a central role in the founding of the New York Public Library in 1895.

Early life
Born in Malden-on-Hudson, New York, he graduated in 1835 from Union College, where he was a member of the Sigma Phi Society and the Philomathean Society and was admitted to the bar in 1838. From 1849 to 1861, he was one of the editors and co-owners of the New York Evening Post.

Political and literary career
Bigelow began his political career as a reform Democrat, working with William Cullen Bryant in New York. In 1848, his antislavery convictions led him to leave the party, and he joined the Free Soil Party. In 1856, he led other former Democrats into the newly formed Republican Party and wrote a campaign biography of John C. Frémont, who won the Republican presidential nomination that year. In 1860, after the Republican Party's nominee, Abraham Lincoln, was elected president, Lincoln appointed him American Consul in Paris in 1861, progressing to Chargé d'Affaires and Envoy Extraordinary and Minister Plenipotentiary to the Court of Napoleon III. In this capacity, working together with Charles Francis Adams, the American ambassador to the United Kingdom, Bigelow helped to block the attempts to have France and the United Kingdom intervene in the American Civil War in favor of the Confederacy, and thereby played a material role in the Union victory. In 1865, he was appointed American ambassador to France.  After leaving this position, he went to Germany, where he lived for three years, through the period of the Franco-Prussian War, and became a friend of Otto von Bismarck.

After the war's conclusion, he returned to New York, where he assisted his old friend Samuel J. Tilden in opposing the corruption that flourished in New York City under William Magear Tweed. Because of the universal respect in which Bigelow was held in New York, he was offered nominations by both political parties for state office in 1872. Under the influence of Tilden, Bigelow decided to rejoin the Democratic party, accepted its nomination, and was elected Secretary of State of New York, a position he held until 1876. When the Democrats nominated Tilden for President in 1876, he served as Tilden's campaign manager, and in that capacity advised Tilden in the famous dispute over the result of the presidential election. Tilden died almost a decade after the dispute was decided in favor of his rival, Rutherford B. Hayes, and Bigelow then acted as one of Tilden's Estate Trust Executors. He carried out Tilden's wishes, over several years, to develop, design, and establish the New York Public Library and served as its first president from May 27, 1895 until his death on December 19, 1911.

He was a staunch proponent of the development of the Panama Canal. He was a friend of Philippe Bunau-Varilla, who brought Panama's declaration of Independence to Bigelow's home. Panama's first proposed flag, made there by Mrs. Bunau Varilla, was rejected by the Panamanians, who made their own.

Bigelow's writing career, begun with Bryant on the New York Evening Post, included several books.  He was one of the first Americans to visit Haiti with an open mind, and published The Wisdom of the Haitians, which, before the Civil War, was one of the few American works to take a positive view of Haitian independence.

Bigelow published an edition of The Autobiography of Benjamin Franklin, in 1868, the first publication taken from Franklin's original, and nearly complete, manuscript, which had been lost sometime after Franklin's death. After haggling over the price, he finally agreed to pay the original asking price of 25,000 franks and purchased the manuscript from William Temple Franklin, Benjamin's Franklin's grandson.  Since the manuscript ended at age 51, in 1757, Bigelow re-worked it, incorporating Franklin’s extensive correspondence, into the three-volume The Life of Benjamin Franklin, Written by Himself, first published in 1874.

In 1895 Bigelow wrote and published The Life of Samuel J. Tilden.

Personal life
On June 11, 1850, Bigelow married Jane Tunis Poultney and they had nine children. They included:
 John Bigelow Jr. (May 12, 1854 – February 29, 1936) graduated from the United States Military Academy at West Point, New York in 1877.  He served in the United States Army in Texas with the Buffalo Soldiers, taught at West Point, served again in the West, and fought and was seriously wounded in Cuba. He retired in October 1904. From 1905 to 1910, he was a professor at M.I.T. During World War I, he was recalled to active duty and served in Washington. He traveled and wrote until his death in 1936.
 Poultney Bigelow (1855-1954) was a lawyer and a noted journalist and editor.
 Flora Bigelow, married firstly Charles S. Dodge and secondly The Hon. Lionel Guest (1880–1935), son of Ivor Bertie Guest, 1st Baron Wimborne (1835–1914).
In 1854 he had a life-changing experience he wrote about in the book The Bible That Was Lost and is Found.

Legacy
On August 8, 2001, New York City Mayor Rudolph Giuliani signed a bill adding the name "John Bigelow Plaza" to the intersection of 41st Street and Fifth Avenue, Manhattan, directly in front of the New York Public Library Main Branch.  His estate at Highland Falls, New York, known as The Squirrels, was listed on the National Register of Historic Places in 1982.

See also

 The Papers of Benjamin Franklin
 Bibliography of Benjamin Franklin

References

Sources

The Life Of Samuel J. Tilden, Written by John Bigelow, 1895. Revised and edited by; Nikki Oldaker 2009:  Samuel Tilden.net
Mr. Lincoln and Friends: John Bigelow
Retrospections of an Active Life. 3 volumes.  New York: Baker & Taylor Co., 1909.
Bigelow Genealogy at fp.enter.net 
Bigelow and Union College, in NYT on May 18, 1913
 
 John Bigelow Papers, The New York Public Library.
The Correspondence of John Bigelow, Union College

External links

 
 

1817 births
1911 deaths
People from Saugerties, New York
Secretaries of State of New York (state)
Ambassadors of the United States to France
Union College (New York) alumni
American Swedenborgians
19th-century American diplomats
New York (state) Democrats
New York (state) Free Soilers
New York (state) Republicans
Presidents of the New York Public Library
Members of the American Academy of Arts and Letters